Vlasaty is an unincorporated community in Dodge County, in the U.S. state of Minnesota.

History
A post office was established at Vlasaty in 1896, and remained in operation until 1906. The community was named by a railroad official.

References

Unincorporated communities in Dodge County, Minnesota
Unincorporated communities in Minnesota